Sir Edward Sassoon, 2nd Baronet may refer to:

 Sir Edward Sassoon, 2nd Baronet, of Kensington Gore, British businessman and politician
 Sir Edward Elias Sassoon, 2nd Baronet